The Towsley Formation is a geologic formation in the Santa Susana Mountains, in Los Angeles County, California.

It preserves fossils dating back to the Neogene period.

See also

 List of fossiliferous stratigraphic units in California
 Paleontology in California

References
 Elsmere Canyon.com: Towsley Canyon Geology 
 

Neogene California
Santa Susana Mountains
Geology of Los Angeles County, California